DeValls (also known as Devalls, DeVall, or Devall) is an unincorporated community in the 5th Ward of West Baton Rouge Parish, Louisiana, United States. DeValls is located approximately 20 miles northwest of Baton Rouge, and is a part of the Baton Rouge metropolitan area. The community is situated along the Mississippi River in northeastern West Baton Rouge. The community is served by Louisiana Highway 415, known locally as the River Road. Nearby Devall Middle School is similarly named.

References

Baton Rouge metropolitan area
Unincorporated communities in West Baton Rouge Parish, Louisiana
Unincorporated communities in Louisiana

bg:Летсуърт